German submarine U-964 was a Type VIIC U-boat of Nazi Germany's Kriegsmarine built for service during World War II. A short-lived boat, U-964 is most noted for being one of three new boats ordered by the Kriegsmarine to attack Convoy ON 206 in the Western Approaches. To do this, the three boats had to travel a long distance on the surface during daylight hours in a region patrolled by Allied aircraft. This had fatal consequences for all U-boats involved.

U-964 was built by the Blohm & Voss shipyards in Hamburg during 1942 as a Type VIIC boat designed to fight in the waters of the Northern Atlantic Ocean. Her construction was rapid and smooth, and following her completion in February 1943 she was taken for training and working-up patrols in the Baltic Sea and off the Norwegian coast. Her commander during this period was veteran submariner Oberleutnant zur See Emmo Hummerjohann, who was experienced in combat operations and was still in charge when she departed Bergen, Norway in early October 1943 for her maiden combat patrol in the North Atlantic.

Design
German Type VIIC submarines were preceded by the shorter Type VIIB submarines. U-964 had a displacement of  when at the surface and  while submerged. She had two shafts and two  propellers.

U-964 was fitted with five  torpedo tubes (four fitted at the bow and one at the stern), fourteen torpedoes, one  SK C/35 naval gun, 220 rounds, and one twin  C/30 anti-aircraft gun. The boat had a complement of between forty-four and sixty.

Service history

War patrol
Following her departure from Norway, she passed into the Atlantic and headed southwards towards the Western Approaches. Realising that the only feasible method of reaching the area on time was to travel on the surface, the three boats proceeded south in full daylight on 16 October 1943.

Fate
Luck ran out fast as a patrolling aircraft spotted the boats and called in Consolidated Liberator aircraft from several different squadrons. A fierce battle followed, in which two Royal Air Force Liberators were shot down before all three boats were sunk. U-964 was seriously damaged by bombs from aircraft of 86 Squadron (particularly from the plane of Flying Officer George Gamble), and began to sink, her crew scrambling over the side into the sea as she settled. Of the approximately 35 men who escaped the submarine, only five survived to be collected by  several days later. Only three of these men subsequently recovered from their ordeal.

References

Bibliography

External links

German Type VIIC submarines
World War II shipwrecks in the Atlantic Ocean
World War II submarines of Germany
U-boats sunk by depth charges
U-boats sunk by British aircraft
U-boats commissioned in 1943
1942 ships
U-boats sunk in 1943
Ships built in Hamburg
Maritime incidents in October 1943